The John Crafton House (also known as Ralroth Farm) is a historic property in Franklin, Tennessee, United States, that was listed on the National Register of Historic Places on April 13, 1988.

It was built, remodeled, or has other significance in about 1813 and c. 1830. It includes Hall-parlor plan and other architecture.

It is a one-story  a one-story, brick house was built in two stages.  The original section was built c.1813 and includes its original nine panel door, with a main facade built in Flemish bond and side facades laid in five- and seven-course common bond.

The property was covered in a 1988 study of Williamson County historical resources.

References

Hall-parlor plan architecture in Tennessee
Houses completed in 1809
Houses in Franklin, Tennessee
Houses on the National Register of Historic Places in Tennessee
National Register of Historic Places in Williamson County, Tennessee